Xi Zhang (born 1984 in Kaifeng, China) is a contemporary artist who lives and works in China and the United States.

Biography
Zhang moved to the United States in 2004 after studying painting at the Beijing Institute of Art and Design. He then studied at the Rocky Mountain College of Art and Design  in Denver and received a Bachelor of Fine Arts in painting in 2008. That same year, the Denver Post selected Zhang as the 2008 Emerging Artist of the Year for his “well developed, surprising mature vision.” In 2011, Zhang was commissioned by CNN to do a painting about post 9/11. On October 26, 2011, Zhang was invited to give a Logan Lecture at Denver Art Museum. He earned a Masters of Fine Art in painting at the University of Colorado at Boulder in 2011. That same year he was voted one of the 12 Best Colorado Artists Under 35 by the Denver Post, as well as one of the seven Visual Arts Pathfinders. In 2012, Zhang has been selected to represent the United States in the Biennial of the Americas. On July 18, 2013, a short documentary of Zhang was featured on PBS  and KUNC for the Art Distract Program.

Awards
 Grand Prize in Painting from See Me
 The 12 best Colorado artists under age 35
 Top Ten Colorado Art Happenings of 2011
 The Pathmakers: Visual Art
 2008 Emerging Artist of the Year

Selected solo exhibitions
 2018 "Xi Zhang" Marc Straus Gallery
 2013 "21st Xi Zhang: 21st Century DNA" McNichols
 2012 "11 Ceremonies" Plus gallery
 2010 "the promise" Denver International Airport
 2010 "Dream Dusts" HeNan Art Museum, China
 2008 "12921" Rule Gallery
 2006 "Never Land" (peace project) Museum of Contemporary Art Denver

References
 Xi Zhang features on PBS
 Hyperlinks To The Past, Xi Zhang features on KUNC Radio Program
 http://www.westword.com/2012-04-05/culture/xi-zhang-plus-gallery-out-figured/
 http://www.denverpost.com/kylemacmillan/ci_11310059
 http://www.denverpost.com/theater/ci_16977018
 http://www.salon-d-arts.org/artists08/artists_zhang.html

External links
 Xi Zhang's official website
 Xi Zhang at Marc Straus Gallery
 Xi Zhang at Plus Gallery
 Xi Zhang at Song Zhuang Art Gallery

1984 births
Living people
Contemporary painters